The following is a list of songs recorded by South Korean girl group STAYC.



Recorded songs

Other songs

Notes

References

 
STAYC